Bay Islands English is an English variety spoken on the Bay Islands Department (Guanaja, Roatán, Utila), Honduras. Ethnologue reported that there were 22,500 native speakers in 2001. Mainlanders know this language as Caracol, which literally means "conch". Genealogically this variety descends from Cayman Islands English.

Phonology 
Bay Islands English is generally rhotic. Although  is always pronounced in words containing the  vowel, it is occasionally absent before a consonant among some speakers.

Bay Islands English has poor distinction between the sounds [v] and [w]. The two sounds are often merged with each other (and sometimes, [b], resulting in a three-way merger) or substituted in opposing positions. Graham (1997) cites the influence of the Twi language, which lacks /v/ in its phoneme inventory, and other West African languages with the same feature as a likely cause for this. A similar process also occurs in Bermudian, Bahamian, Saban, Vincentian, and other Caribbean Englishes. However, it is also possible for these sounds ([w] and [β]) to be realized as variants of a single phoneme. Warantz (1983) also claims that [w] occurs categorically before /a/, /ʌ/, and /ə/ and variably with [β] in all other environments. However, the phonemic contrast in Bay Island English is generally neutralized in all environments, with possible realizations including [w], [v], [β], [ɥ], [ʋ], [b], and [ɞ]. Graham (1997) has judged [w◌̥] as the most common realization, and the usual realization of /v/ post-vocally. A word-final /v/ (as in have, live or love) is often raised through the influence of the following element, thus causing it to be realized as either [w◌̥] or a vowel with a [ɞ]-like quality. This results in intervocal sequences such as [ɐw◌̥], [ɛw◌̥], and [ɵw◌̥]. [w] can occur before both front and non-front values, and it is only unlikely to occur before [i] and [e]. [ɥ] can only occur before [i] and [ɪ]. [β] occurs before [ɪ], [e], and [ɛ]. [v] occurs in the same positions as in Standard English, but never where SE has [w]. Whenever [v] occurs intervocally or as the first element of a consonant cluster, it may be dropped altogether. This results in pronunciations such as [nɒ:r] (never), [hʌn] (having) and [pe:d] (paved). [b] is found sporadically among creole-influenced speakers.

Notes

References

Bibliography 
 
 
 
 

Bay Islands Department
Languages of Honduras
Caribbean English